Burkina Faso participated in the 2010 Summer Youth Olympics in Singapore.

The Burkina Faso team consisted of 3 athletes competing in 3 sports: athletics, swimming and taekwondo.

Athletics

Note: The athletes who do not have a "Q" next to their Qualification Rank advance to a non-medal ranking final.

Boys
Track and road events

Swimming

Taekwondo

Men's

References

External links
Competitors List: Burkina Faso

Nations at the 2010 Summer Youth Olympics
2010 in Burkinabé sport
Burkina Faso at the Youth Olympics